Jesus Ruiz (born January 2, 1990) is a Mexican professional Boxer from Nogales, Sonora, Mexico. He has currently 41 wins, 5 draws, and 9 losses. He currently fights in the super bantamweight division.

References

External links
 

Mexican male boxers
1990 births
Place of birth missing (living people)
Living people
Boxers from Sonora
People from Nogales, Sonora
Super-bantamweight boxers